Live at the Rainbow '74 is a live album by the British rock band Queen released on 8 September 2014.

Release and content
The album was released in single CD, double CD, DVD, SD Blu-ray and quadruple vinyl formats, as well as a deluxe box set including reproduction tour memorabilia. The single disc and video editions contain a concert from the band's Sheer Heart Attack Tour, recorded live at the Rainbow Theatre in London on 19 & 20 November 1974, while the double CD and vinyl releases include this material plus a concert recorded at the Rainbow earlier in the year, on 31 March, as part of the Queen II Tour. The DVD and Blu-ray also include four bonus tracks from the earlier Queen II concert.

The video footage was previously released as Live at the Rainbow, a half-hour film containing footage from both November shows. It was shown in cinemas in the 1970s and 1980s as an opener to films, including longer concert films by Led Zeppelin and Pink Floyd, as well as the release of Jaws 2 in British cinemas. More footage from the November shows was later released on VHS as part of the Box of Tricks box set in 1992, though this footage was heavily overdubbed. Althugh not to the same extent, the November concerts on this release are also overdubbed, however they also employ pitch correction in some areas. This extends to the March concert as well, however there are no overdubs on that concert.

One song from the album was previously available as audio. "Stone Cold Crazy" was released as a b-side to "The Miracle" single in 1989.

Track listing

Single CD/DVD/SD Blu-ray (November concerts)

DVD/SD Blu-ray Bonus (March concert)

Double CD/Quadruple vinyl

Disc one (Queen II tour)

Disc two (Sheer Heart Attack tour)

2-LP Vinyl Edition
LP 1 (Queen II tour)

LP 2 (Sheer Heart Attack tour)

Personnel
Freddie Mercury – lead vocals, piano
Brian May – guitar, backing vocals, ukulele on "Bring Back That Leroy Brown"
Roger Taylor – drums, percussion, backing vocals
John Deacon – bass guitar, backing vocals on 8, 12, 14, 19, 20, triangle on "Killer Queen"

Charts

Release history

References

External links
 Press Release

Queen (band) live albums
2014 live albums
Virgin Records live albums
Hollywood Records live albums